The 1979 Broxbourne Council election was held to elect council members of the Broxbourne Borough Council - the local government authority of the borough of Broxbourne,  Hertfordshire, England.

Composition of expiring seats before election

Election results

Results summary 

An election was held in 14 wards on 3 May 1979.

No seats changes hands at this election

The political balance of the council following this election was:

Conservative 37 seats
Labour 5 seats

Ward results

References
Lea Valley Mercury Friday 11 May 1979 Edition

1979
1979 English local elections
1970s in Hertfordshire